Nakajima Isileli (中島 イシレリ) (born 9 July 1989) is a Tongan-born Japanese rugby union player who generally plays as a prop represents Japan internationally and plays for Kobelco Steelers in the Japanese Top League. 

Nakajima made his international debut for Japan against New Zealand on 3 November 2018. He was included in the Japanese squad for the 2019 Rugby World Cup which is currently held in Japan for the first time and for the first time in Asia.

Nakajima was a teenager when he moved to Japan after he was scouted by a Japanese university coach. Nakajima chose to take his wife's surname partly in defiance of the patriarchal norms of his home country but also out of respect and love for his wife and his adopted home.

References 

Japanese rugby union players
Japan international rugby union players
Living people
1989 births
Tongan expatriates in Japan
Rugby union props
Kobelco Kobe Steelers players
Ryutsu Keizai University alumni
Green Rockets Tokatsu players